Crittenden is a home rule-class city in Grant and Kenton counties, Kentucky, in the United States. The population was 3,815 as of the 2010 census, up from 2,401 at the 2000 census.

Geography
Crittenden is located in northern Grant County at  (38.782248, -84.605794). A small portion of the northern border of the city touches the Boone County line, and another part of the city extends north into Kenton County.

Interstate 75 passes through Crittenden, with access from Exit 166; I-75 leads north  to Cincinnati and south  to Lexington. U.S. Route 25 (Dixie Highway) is a local road running parallel to I-75 that passes through the center of Crittenden; US 25 leads north  to Walton and south  to Williamstown, the Grant County seat.

History
The area of what is now Crittenden may have been settled as early as 1812. The community was called "Pin Hook" until 1834, when it was renamed for Kentucky statesman and later governor John J. Crittenden.

Demographics

As of the census of 2000, there were 2,401 people, 870 households, and 634 families residing in the city. The racial makeup of the city was 98.21% White, 0.42% African American, 0.25% Native American, 0.17% Asian, 0.08% Pacific Islander, 0.33% from other races, and 0.54% from two or more races. Hispanic or Latino of any race were 1.25% of the population.

There were 870 households, out of which 46.7% had children under the age of 18 living with them, 55.5% were married couples living together, 12.4% had a female householder with no husband present, and 27.1% were non-families. 19.7% of all households were made up of individuals, and 3.8% had someone living alone who was 65 years of age or older. The average household size was 2.76 and the average family size was 3.19.

In the city, the population was spread out, with 32.5% under the age of 18, 12.0% from 18 to 24, 36.1% from 25 to 44, 15.0% from 45 to 64, and 4.4% who were 65 years of age or older. The median age was 28 years. For every 100 females, there were 95.5 males. For every 100 females age 18 and over, there were 91.4 males.

The median income for a household in the city was $40,944, and the median income for a family was $44,038. Males had a median income of $31,399 versus $24,556 for females. The per capita income for the city was $16,573. About 6.2% of families and 8.4% of the population were below the poverty line, including 10.1% of those under age 18 and 6.0% of those age 65 or over.

Notable people
Crittenden is the home of Survivor contestant Rodger Bingham. It is also the home of country music artist and songwriter Lisa Shaffer. Her band is named after a ridge in Crittenden, Heathen Ridge.

References

External links
  Historical Texts and Images of Crittenden

Cities in Kentucky
Cities in Grant County, Kentucky
Cities in Kenton County, Kentucky